Claremont Unified School District is a Los Angeles County school district in Claremont, California. It consists of 7 elementary schools, 1 intermediate and 2 high schools, the main one is Claremont High School.

The district serves Claremont and a section of Pomona.

References

External links 
 Official District homepage

Claremont, California
School districts in Los Angeles County, California
Pomona, California